Nicholas John Albert Fairfax, 14th Lord Fairfax of Cameron (born 4 January 1956), is a Scottish nobleman, peer, and politician. He is the current (as of 2015) holder of the title of Lord Fairfax of Cameron, succeeding his father, Thomas Fairfax, 13th Lord Fairfax of Cameron.

Early life and education
Nicholas John Albert Fairfax was born 4 January 1956, the eldest son of Thomas Fairfax, 13th Lord Fairfax of Cameron (1923–1964), and his wife, Sonia Helen Gunston (1927–2017).  Fairfax was educated at Eton and Downing College, Cambridge (LLB in International Law), is a barrister and was called to the Bar following becoming a member of Gray's Inn (1977).

Career
Lord Fairfax's directorships of several companies are as follows: Thomas Miller P and I, and Thomas Miller Defence, 1987–1990; Sedgwick Marine & Cargo Ltd, 1995–1996; British-Georgian Soc. Ltd, 2006; Sovcomflot (UK) Ltd, since 2005; Sovcomflot, 2007. He is Patron of AMUR Tiger and Leopard Charity, 2006. He is a Freeman of the City of London and a Liveryman of the Shipwrights' Company.

He was a member of the House of Lords first from 1977 to 1999. In November 2015, he was elected to return to the House at a Conservative hereditary peers' by-election, following the death of Lord Montagu of Beaulieu (1926–2015).

In 2020, Lord Fairfax endorsed Justin Fairfax, Lieutenant Governor of the U.S. state of Virginia, in his bid for Governor in the 2021 Virginia gubernatorial election. Lt. Gov. Fairfax's great-great-great-grandfather was a slave manumitted by Thomas Fairfax, 9th Lord Fairfax of Cameron.

Personal life
In 1982, he married Annabella Ruth Morriss (born 13 January 1957), eldest daughter of Nicholas and of Sarah Gilham Morriss, of Newmarket, by whom he has three sons:
Hon. Edward Nicholas Thomas Fairfax, Master of Fairfax (born 20 September 1984)
Hon. John Frederick Anthony Fairfax (born 27 June 1986)
Hon. Rory Henry Francis Fairfax (born 21 May 1991)
His heir apparent to the title is his eldest son, the Hon. Edward Nicholas Thomas Fairfax.

References

External links 
 Lord Fairfax's listing at Burke's Peerage BROKEN LINK
 Debrett's People of Today

1956 births
Living people
Conservative Party (UK) hereditary peers
Nicholas
People educated at Eton College
Alumni of Downing College, Cambridge
Members of Gray's Inn
Lords Fairfax of Cameron
Fairfax of Cameron
Fairfax of Cameron